This article covers the phonology of modern Colognian as spoken in the city of Cologne. Varieties spoken outside of Cologne are only briefly covered where appropriate. Historic precedent versions are not considered.

There are slight pronunciation variations in Colognian which can be considered regional within the city, and some others seemingly more reflecting social status. The phonological impact of either is marginal.

Spelling of Colognian can follow several standards. Pronunciation variations are allowed to show as variant spellings in all of them. Because the spellings of single words may differ widely between systems, listing spellings in examples of phonological nature is not helpful. Thus, only IPA transcriptions are used here in examples.

Colognian is part of the Continental West Germanic dialect continuum. It is a central Ripuarian language. Ripuarian languages are related to Moselle Franconian and Limburgish. Local languages of all three groups are usually not understood at once by Colognian speakers, but comparatively easily learned.

Other languages almost always spoken by Colognian speakers today are the Rhinelandic and Standard varieties of German. Mixed language use is common today, so that in an average speakers awareness, Colognian lexemes are contrasting the two kinds of German ones as well.

Colognian has about 60 base phonemes and some 22 double consonants and diphthongs, depending on analysis.

Consonants 
With about 25 phonemes, the Colognian consonant system exhibits an average number of consonants in comparison with other languages.
Notable differences with the enveloping German language are the absence of the fricative  and the High German affricate .
All Colognian consonants are pulmonic with the obvious exception of the glottal stop  which briefly interrupts the pulmonic air flow.

 While Colognian has only one lateral phoneme , it has a variety of allophonic realizations; coarticulation leads to the so-called "clear" L occasionally, but the "dark" or palatal variants are common in Colognian pronunciation. Arguably,  is the most common.  Retroflex or velar variants are also possible.
 The phoneme  may be uvular or velar. Some Landkölsch varieties of Ripuarian spoken outside the city have ,  or  instead of the Colognian  in certain positions, or throughout. Though often closely related, Colognian speakers consider these foreign sounds.
  (which may also be a uvular ) becomes voiced due to coarticulations or liaison:
  ('anymore') →  →  ('another one').
Though transcribed distinctly by one group of authors, there appears to be only one possible minimal pair; both words are rarely used and :
  ('downpour' m.)
  ('willow reed' f.)
The Rheinische Dokumenta writing system does not distinguish between them, others most usually do.
Whether the IPA symbol  is a correct notation for the phone, is disputed.
 The phoneme  has the allophone  in certain environmental and prosodic circumstances.

The phoneme  has allophonic variations. Coarticulative variations cover a range from the standard English "light"  to strongly velarized and/or pharyngealized versions. The average Colognian  is "darker" and often spoken with the lips more protruded than English versions. Since the audible difference may be small despite different articulations, foreigners often confuse it with the phone .

Terminal devoicing 
Colognian, similar to German, Dutch, and other West Central German varieties, exhibits a phenomenon called terminal devoicing or : in the word-final position, voiced consonant phonemes lose their voicing to become unvoiced. In the absence of liaisons and coarticulations, only the unvoiced, or fortis, variant is pronounced.

Initial voicing 
For the phoneme  only, Colognian has initial voicing, quite like German has it. That means,  never appears in word-initial position, only  does.

Vowels 

Tone 
Colognian and other Ripuarian dialects have two pitch accents, commonly called 'Accent 1' and 'Accent 2'. The distinction occurs on stressed heavy syllables. Accent 1 is the marked tone, while Accent 2 is the default. Accent 1 has a falling pitch in the city of Cologne, though the realizations of the two tones differ elsewhere.

The terminology for the two tones can be somewhat confusing. Following are the German and (in italics) Dutch terminology.
 {| class=wikitable
! Accent 1 !! Accent 2
|-
|Tonakzent 1 (T1) ||Tonakzent 2 (T2)
|-
|Schärfung (+Schärfung) ||(−Schärfung)
|-
|geschärft (+geschärft)||ungeschärft (−geschärft)
|-
|Stoßton ||Schleifton
|-
|stoottoon||sleeptoon
|-
|hoge toon||valtoon
|-
|accent 1||accent 2
|}

(Note that the Dutch hoge toon "high tone" and valtoon "falling tone" are descriptive only, and not consistent between varieties of Ripuarian. They would be misnomers for Colognian.)

Accent 1 (T1) can only occur on stressed, heavy syllables: that is, syllables with long vowels, diphthongs, or a short vowel followed by a sonorant. Minimal pairs include T2  "stiff, rigid" vs. T1  "stiffness, rigidity; starch",  "house (nom./acc.)" vs.  "house (dat.)",  "bad" vs.  "beats, blows, strikes (n. pl.)" with long vowels,  "she" vs.  "sieve" with a diphthong, and  "(I/he) can" vs.  "(tea)pot, jug" with a short vowel plus sonorant.

See also 

 Colognian grammar
 Kerkrade dialect phonology

Notes 

Phonology
Germanic phonologies